Turgenevskaya is a station on the Kaluzhsko-Rizhskaya Line of the Moscow Metro.

Name
It was named after Turgenevskaya Square, to which the entrances to the station lead; the square itself was named after a Russian novelist and playwright Ivan Turgenev.

Design
The station was designed by Ivan Taranov, Yu. Vdovin, and I. Petukhova and opened on 5 January 1972. Turgenevskaya has simple white marble pylons which follow the curve of the station tube and a ceiling composed of reinforced plastic panels. Metal cornices run the length of the station along the base of the ceiling. The walls, which are faced with white and black marble, are decorated with chased brass panels by Kh. Rysin and D. Bodniek.

Transfers
From this station, passengers can transfer to Sokolnicheskaya Line at Chistye Prudy station and to Lyublinsko-Dmitrovskaya Line at Sretensky Bulvar station.

Moscow Metro stations
Railway stations in Russia opened in 1971
Kaluzhsko-Rizhskaya Line
1971 establishments in the Soviet Union
Ivan Turgenev
Railway stations located underground in Russia